Ricardo Auturo "Carlos" Powell (born August 29, 1983) is an American basketball player, who last played for Trotamundos de Carabobo of the Liga Profesional de Baloncesto in Venezuela.

He is notable for receiving the NIT Most Valuable Player award, in the NIT tournament. Other honors he has received include 2003-2004 All SEC, 2004-2005 Preseason All SEC, and 2005 Team outstanding rebounder. Throughout his four-year career, he scored over 1500 points (1541), 600 rebounds (641), and 70 3-point field goals (71). He also holds the school record for most games played with 132.

Professional career
After college, Powell played professionally for Benfica in Portugal where he was the fourth leading scorer in the league with 19.4 points and 7 rebounds a game. He was subsequently named to the All-League MVP team and all league imports first team.

Powell played for the New Zealand Breakers of the Australian National Basketball League during the 2006-2007 season. He shone in his debut with the Breakers, scoring 34 points against the South Dragons. Powell was arguably the team's best player throughout the 06-07 season, leading the league in points scored with 28.3 per game. He was also top 10 in the league in steals, and won the 06-07 slam-dunk competition at the NBL All-Star game.

Carlos played for the Golden State Warriors in the NBA Summer League in 2007. After failing to secure a contract, he was signed by the Ukrainian team Azovmash Mariupol.

On November 1, 2007 Carlos was selected 2nd overall in the draft by the Dakota Wizards of the NBA D-League . In the D-league, he averaged 22 ppg, 6.6 rebounds, 4.7 assists and 1.4 steals.
 
On November 1, 2009 Carlos was selected 1st overall in the draft by the Albuquerque Thunderbirds of the NBA D-League although he did not stay the entire season. He finished up in the CBL with the Liaoning Panpan Hunters, he averaged 25 ppg, 6.6rebounds.

In 2011 Powell played for Zob Ahan Isfahan in Isfahan, Iran averaging 20ppg, 12rpg and 3.5apg.

In August 2011 he signed with Maccabi Haifa B.C. in Israel.

He return to the Incheon Elephants in South Korea for the 2012-13 KBL season.

He was again signed by Incheon ET Land Elephants for 2013-2014 KBL season.

In February 2017, Powell signed with Trotamundos. In July 2017, Powell was named Most Valuable Player of the 2017 Liga Profesional de Baloncesto season.

References

External links
NBA D-League profile
South Carolina profile
Breakers player profile
RealGM.com profile

1983 births
Living people
Albuquerque Thunderbirds players
American expatriate basketball people in Argentina
American expatriate basketball people in Iran
American expatriate basketball people in New Zealand
American expatriate basketball people in Portugal
American expatriate basketball people in South Korea
American expatriate basketball people in Ukraine
American expatriate basketball people in Venezuela
American men's basketball players
Basketball players from South Carolina
BC Azovmash players
Dakota Wizards players
Estudiantes Concordia basketball players
Forwards (basketball)
Daegu KOGAS Pegasus players
Jeonju KCC Egis players
Korean Basketball League players
Liaoning Flying Leopards players
Maccabi Haifa B.C. players
New Zealand Breakers players
S.L. Benfica basketball players
South Carolina Gamecocks men's basketball players
Sportspeople from Florence, South Carolina
Trotamundos B.B.C. players